Robinsons Butuan (formerly Robinsons Place Butuan) is a shopping mall located in Jose C. Aquino Avenue (Butuan–Cagayan de Oro–Iligan Road), Brgy. Bayanihan, Butuan. It is Robinsons Land's 33rd commercial center in the Philippines and the 4th Robinsons Mall in Mindanao after Robinsons Cagayan de Oro, Robinsons Cybergate Davao and Robinsons Place Gensan. It covers an area of over  making it the largest Robinsons Mall in Mindanao. It was opened to the public on November 25, 2013. The mall also features 102-room hotel component that occupies 4th and 5th levels in the east wing of the building. One of the mall's main tenants is the DFA CO Butuan, the first passport office of the Department of Foreign Affairs in the Caraga region which opened in June 2015 at the mall's third level. An expansion wing, located beside the mall, was opened on August 2, 2017, and will feature more shops and restaurants plus the new integrated land transport terminal (bound for travel to and from Cagayan de Oro, Malaybalay and Davao City except for Surigao City, which is based in the old Langihan Bus Terminal).

See also
Robinsons Malls
SM City Butuan
List of shopping malls in the Philippines

References

Shopping malls in the Philippines
Buildings and structures in Butuan
Robinsons Malls
Shopping malls established in 2013